A conference of the parties (COP; , CP) is the supreme governing body of an international convention (treaty, written agreement between actors in international law).  It is composed of representatives of the member states of the convention and accredited observers. Scope of the COP is to review the "implementation of the Convention and any other legal instruments that the COP adopts and take decisions necessary to promote the effective implementation of the Convention".

Conventions with a COP include:

 Basel Convention
 Chemical Weapons Convention
 Convention on Biological Diversity
 2012 Hyderabad Biodiversity Conference (COP11)
 2022 United Nations Biodiversity Conference (COP15)
 Convention on the Conservation of Migratory Species of Wild Animals
 Convention on International Trade in Endangered Species of Wild Fauna and Flora
 Kyoto Protocol
 Minamata Convention on Mercury
 Ramsar Convention
 Rotterdam Convention
 Stockholm Convention on Persistent Organic Pollutants
 Treaty on the Non-Proliferation of Nuclear Weapons
 United Nations Convention to Combat Desertification
 United Nations Convention against Corruption

 United Nations Framework Convention on Climate Change
 United Nations Climate Change conference
 WHO Framework Convention on Tobacco Control

See also 
 Conference of the Parties (disambiguation)
 International law

References

Further reading
 

International law